William Albert Titus (August 30, 1868 – February 2, 1951) was an American businessman, educator, writer, historian, and politician.

Born in Empire, Wisconsin, Titus went to the University of Chicago and University of Wisconsin–Madison and taught high school. As a businessman, he helped organize a stone and lime company and a savings and loan company. Titus was a historian and writer and was involved with the Wisconsin Historical Society. Titus served in the Wisconsin State Senate from 1921 to 1928. He died in Fond du Lac, Wisconsin.

Notes

1868 births
1951 deaths
People from Empire, Wisconsin
University of Chicago alumni
University of Wisconsin–Madison alumni
Educators from Wisconsin
Businesspeople from Wisconsin
Wisconsin state senators
Writers from Wisconsin